The Mayor of Skopje is the city mayor who is representing North Macedonia's capital city Greater Skopje and all of its municipalities. Also, the mayor's decisions are confirmed or rejected by the City Council of Skopje. The obligations of the mayor include:

 declaring the acts of the Council and publishes them in the "Official Gazette of the City of Skopje"; 
 caring and ensuring the implementation of the acts of the Council;
 caring for the activities that with law are entrusted to the City of Skopje;
 proposing to the Council for making decisions and other general acts of its jurisdiction, etc.

Mayor cooperates with the municipal mayors of the city of Skopje, for building common views, common setting priorities and taking joint action on certain issues and problems of interest to the city as a whole. The current mayor of Skopje is Danela Arsovska.

City Council 

The council of Skopje has in total 45 councilors which are elected in general, direct, free and democratic elections. The members of the City Council are elected with a mandate that lasts four years. The councilors represent the citizens. The current president of the council is Irena Misheva. The duties of the council are:

 adopts the Statute of the City of Skopje and other regulations;
 adopts the budget and annual account of the City of Skopje;
 determines the amount of its own sources of revenue to fund the City of Skopje, within the borders determined by law;
 establishes public services within the remit of the City and supervises their work;
 adopts programs and financial plans to fund public services; funder is the City of Skopje;
 adopts reports on budget execution and the annual account of the City of Skopje;
 grants permission to perform activities of public interest and local significance, in accordance with law;
 adopts the reports on working and annual accounts of public services; funder is the City of Skopje;
 decides on how to dispose of the property of the City of Skopje;
 decides on how to perform the financial control of the budget of the City of Skopje, in accordance with law;
 reviews and adopts the annual report on public safety in the area of the City of Skopje, which is submitted to the Ministry of Internal Affairs and the Ombudsman;
 makes recommendations to the manager of the local branch of the Ministry of Internal Affairs of public security and safety in traffic, etc.

List of mayors of Skopje 
The list of the mayors of Skopje includes the following persons:

Kingdom of Serbia

Kingdom of Bulgaria

Kingdom of Yugoslavia

Kingdom of Bulgaria

Socialist Federative Republic of Yugoslavia

Republic of North Macedonia

See also
 Timeline of Skopje

References 

Lists of mayors